Javed Iqbal (Urdu: ‎; 5 October 1924 – 3 October 2015) was a Pakistani philosopher and senior justice of the Supreme Court of Pakistan. He was internationally known for his acclaimed publications on philosophy of law and modern Islamic philosophy in international and national journals.

He was the son of the poet-philosopher Muhammad Iqbal, who inspired the Pakistan Movement. Javed authored various books on Pakistan's nationalism movement and political ideology. Apart from philosophy, Javed had a prolific career in the Judiciary of Pakistan and was a former Chief Justice of the Lahore High Court before being elevated to the Supreme Court.

Early life
Javed Iqbal was born in Sialkot on 5 October 1924 to Allama Muhammad Iqbal and his second wife, Sardar Begum. His mother died when he was 11, and his father died in 1938 when he was 14.

Javed Iqbal received the following educational degrees and distinctions: BA (Honors) degree in 1944 from the Government College, Lahore; MA degree in English, and MA degree in Philosophy (Gold Medallist) in 1948; Doctor of Philosophy degree in Philosophy in 1954 from the University of Cambridge, UK; and Barrister-at-Law, Lincoln's Inn, London, in 1956. He has received honorary doctorates degrees from Villanova University, United States, and Seljuk University in Jordan.

Career
Javed began as an advocate in Lahore High Court, and later became a judge in 1971 and then Chief Justice of the court. He was also a judge in the Supreme Court of Pakistan, and an Elected member in the Senate of Pakistan (Upper House of Parliament).

He has published papers on Islamic political thought, political ideology in Pakistan and the philosophy of his father, Muhammad Iqbal, which were published in national and international journals. During the years 1960–62  and in 1977, he was the delegate of Pakistan to the United Nations General Assembly.

He had argued in favour of reforms in the Hudud laws of Pakistan from General Zia Ul-Haq ruling period. Javed Iqbal ran against Zulfikar Ali Bhutto on a Pakistan Muslim League ticket in the 1970 General Election in Pakistan, but eventually decided to leave politics. At one time, he even declined Bhutto's offer for him to join Pakistan Peoples Party.

He was married to Nasira Iqbal, a retired Lahore High Court Judge.

Awards and recognition
Hilal-i-Imtiaz (Crescent of Distinction) by the President of Pakistan in 2004.

Death and legacy
Javed Iqbal died on 3 October 2015 at age 90. He was under treatment for cancer at the Shaukat Khanum Memorial Cancer Hospital and Research Centre in Lahore. Among the survivors are his widow Nasira Iqbal and two sons - Walid Iqbal and Munib Iqbal.

Javed Iqbal's funeral at Hazrat Ishaan graveyard at Baghbanpura, Lahore, Pakistan was attended by many Pakistani dignitaries including Chaudhary Nisar Ali Khan, Chief Justice of Pakistan Anwar Zaheer Jamali, former President of Pakistan Muhammad Rafiq Tarar and former Supreme Court judge Khalil-ur-Rehman Ramday.

Allama Iqbal on his son
Javed's father, Allama Iqbal, named his book, Javid Nama, after his son. He also wrote many poems to Javed Iqbal, indirectly addressing the Muslim youth in British India. Javed Iqbal later translated two of Allama Iqbal's books into Urdu – Javid Nama and Reconstruction of religious thought in Islam.

Here is an excerpt from the translation of Bal-i-Jibril (Gabriel's Wing)

TO JAVED
(On Receiving His First Letter From London)

Create a place for thyself in the world of love;
Create a new age, new days, and new nights.

If God grant thee an eye for nature's beauty,
Converse with the silence of flowers; respond to their love.

Do not be beholden to the West's artisans,
Seek thy sustenance in what thy land affords.

My ghazal is the essence of my life-blood,
Create thy elixir of life out 'of this essence.

My way of life is poverty, not the pursuit of wealth;
Barter not thy Selfhood; win a name in adversity.

Works
Javed's publications include the following:

Ideology of Pakistan (1959)
Stray Reflections: A Note-Book of Iqbal (1961)
Legacy of Quaid-e-Azam (1968, published in English and Urdu)
Mai Lala Faam (1968, collection of papers on Iqbal, in Urdu)
Zinda Rood (1984, biography of Iqbal in three volumes, in Urdu)
Afkare-Iqbal (1994, interpretation of Iqbal's thought)
Pakistan and the Islamic Liberal Movement (1994).
Jahan-I Javed : darame, Afsane, Maqale
Islam and Pakistan's Identity
The Concept of State in Islam : A Reassessment
Apna Greban Chaak(autobiography) (2002)
Khutbat e Iqbal
Books on Dr Javid Iqbal
 Life After Iqbal (2016, Fastprint Publishing, UK by Sabeena Khan) .

References

External links

1924 births
2015 deaths
Alumni of the University of Cambridge
Pakistani autobiographers
Pakistani people of Kashmiri descent
Recipients of Hilal-i-Imtiaz
Iqbal scholars
20th-century Muslim scholars of Islam
Islamic philosophers
Pakistani philosophers
Pakistani biographers
Pakistani judges
Members of Lincoln's Inn
Alumni of the Inns of Court School of Law
Pakistani scholars
Pakistani dramatists and playwrights
Pakistani Muslims
Javed
Government College University, Lahore alumni
Chief Justices of the Lahore High Court
Justices of the Supreme Court of Pakistan